The odrecillo was a small bagpipe of medieval Iberia (modern Spain and Portugal).  The instrument is found with or without drones.

The term is derived from the word odre ("goatskin").  This term has also been applied to a different instrument, the bladder pipe.

References

Early musical instruments
Spanish musical instruments
Bagpipes